Yvo or YVO may refer to:

People
 Yvo, a Dutch given name meaning Yves or Yvon
 Yvo of Kermartin (1253–1303), Christian saint
 Yvo of Chartres (1040–1115), Christian saint
 Yvo de Boer (born 1954), Dutch diplomat and environmentalist
 , Dutch politician
 Yvo van Engelen (born 1985), Dutch footballer

Other
 Val-d'Or Airport (IATA code: YVO), Quebec, Canada
 Yellowstone Volcano Observatory, an organization created to monitor and advise on the Yellowstone supervolcano

Given names derived from plants or flowers